Eusebio Edjang Nguema (born 3 March 1994) is an Equatorial Guinean professional footballer who plays as a midfielder for Deportivo Mongomo.

External links 
 

1994 births
Living people
People from Mongomo
Equatoguinean footballers
Equatorial Guinea international footballers
Deportivo Mongomo players
Association football midfielders